Gullickson is a surname.

Notable people with this surname include:
 Bill Gullickson (born 1959), American baseball player
 Carly Gullickson (born 1986), American tennis player
 Chelsey Gullickson (born 1990), American tennis player
 Lloyd Gullickson (1899-1982), American golfer
 Thomas Gullickson (born 1950), American prelate

See also
 Gullikson